Rugushuiyeh or Rogushuiyeh or Rugoshuiyeh may refer to:
 Rugushuiyeh-ye Olya
 Rugushuiyeh-ye Sofla